Ulterior Motive may refer to:

 "Spiral" (Pendulum song), with the song "Ulterior Motive"
 Ulterior Motive (film), a 2015 Chinese action thriller film